Stadtlohn-Vreden Airport (German: Flugplatz Stadtlohn-Vreden)  is an airfield located  west of Stadtlohn, in the Borken district, Germany. Its runway lays adjacent to the Dutch border. The airfield is used for general aviation, as well for gliding and skydiving.

Plans are made to extend the runway to  but these plans are controversial. Local political parties disagree with each other whether growth is worthwhile the 8 million Euro investment. The final decision by the Kreistag was expected at 2 April 2009 but is postponed. As of 2 October 2010, the runway extension works have begun.

See also

 Transport in Germany
 List of airports in Germany

External links
 

Airports in North Rhine-Westphalia
Stadtlohn